Kharabalinsky District is an administrative and municipal district (raion), one of the eleven in Astrakhan Oblast, Russia. It is located in the central and eastern parts of the oblast. Its administrative center is the town of Kharabali. Population:  40,955 (2002 Census);  The population of Kharabali accounts for 44.0% of the district's total population.

Ethnic Russians make up 51% of the district's population. The second largest ethnic group is the Kazakhs that account for 42% of the population. Smaller minority communities include Nogais, Tatars and Armenians.

References

Notes

Sources

Districts of Astrakhan Oblast